LP4 is the fourth studio album by Ratatat, released on June 8, 2010. The name comes from the acronym for long play (LP), as it is their fourth album. It is similarly titled to their third release, LP3. A majority of the tracks are from the same studio session as their previous album.

Background
The album largely features material produced during the session of Ratatat's previous album LP3, recorded at Old Soul Studios in New York City. Evan Mast of the duo stated, "A lot of the sounds and palettes are similar, but I think the songs change pretty drastically." Ratatat had purchased several Middle Eastern percussion instruments, which are featured in LP4. The album also features a string quartet, whereas previous Ratatat albums had used a Mellotron. The string sections were recorded at Glassworks Studios in Manhattan. Music videos were produced for the tracks "Drugs", "Mahalo" "Neckbrace", and "Party With Children".
The album contains numerous spoken word samples, including a line from Werner Herzog's 1977 film Stroszek segueing "Bilar" and "Drugs".

Reception 

The album debuted on the Billboard 200 at #66 selling 6,700 copies in its first week.

Track listing
"Bilar" – 4:14
"Drugs" – 4:55
"Neckbrace" – 4:06
"We Can't Be Stopped" – 2:10
"Bob Gandhi" – 4:01
"Mandy" – 3:42
"Mahalo" – 2:02
"Party with Children" – 2:58
"Sunblocks" – 3:42
"Bare Feast" – 2:38
"Grape Juice City" – 3:56
"Alps" – 4:21
iTunes pre-order bonus track
"Biddang" – 3:21

Chart positions

Weekly

Year-end

References 

Ratatat albums
2010 albums
XL Recordings albums
Albums produced by E*vax